Kim Do-hyeon (Hangul: 김도현) (born September 15, 2000, in Seoul) is a South Korean pitcher for the Hanwha Eagles of the KBO League.

References 

Hanwha Eagles players
KBO League pitchers
South Korean baseball players
2000 births
Living people